In astrophysics, Chandrasekhar potential energy tensor  provides the gravitational potential of a body due to its own gravity created by the distribution of matter across the body, named after the Indian American astrophysicist Subrahmanyan Chandrasekhar. The Chandrasekhar tensor is a generalization of potential energy in other words, the trace of the Chandrasekhar tensor provides the potential energy of the body.

Definition

The Chandrasekhar potential energy tensor is defined as

where

where 
 is the Gravitational constant
 is the self-gravitating potential from Newton's law of gravity
 is the generalized version of 
 is the matter density distribution
 is the volume of the body

It is evident that  is a symmetric tensor from its definition. The trace of the Chandrasekhar  tensor  is nothing but the potential energy .

Hence Chandrasekhar tensor can be viewed as the generalization of potential energy.

Chandrasekhar's Proof

Consider  a matter of volume  with density . Thus

Chandrasekhar tensor in terms of scalar potential

The scalar potential is defined as

then Chandrasekhar proves that

Setting  we get , taking Laplacian again, we get .

See also

 Virial theorem
 Chandrasekhar virial equations

References

Stellar dynamics
Astrophysics